The 1972–73 Bradford City A.F.C. season was the 60th in the club's history.

The club finished 16th in Division Four, reached the 4th round of the FA Cup, and the 2nd round of the League Cup.

Sources

References

Bradford City A.F.C. seasons
Bradford City